Ana Petra Pérez Florido (6 December 1845 – 16 August 1906), also known as Petra of Saint Joseph, was a Spanish Catholic nun. She established the Congregation of the Mothers of the Abandoned to care for the abandoned as well as the elderly and infirm.

She was beatified by Pope John Paul II on 16 October 1994.

Life
Ana Petra Pérez Florido was born on December 6, 1845 in Spain and was the last of five children to José Perez and Maria Florido; she was baptized with the name of "Ana Josefa".

Her mother died when she was three and her paternal grandmother, Teresa Reina, was interested in her education and so assumed control of her education. From her she learnt about the importance of the Eucharist as well as a devotion to the Mother of God as well as a special devotion to Saint Joseph. Twice two men of good families asked her for marriage but her father rejected such proposals for political reasons. It was all to her relief for she said: "I have no vocation for marriage". True to her word she declined all future opportunities for marriage and her parents did not respond well to her refusals and were even harsher when she informed her parents of her desire to join religious life as a servant of God.

Her parents attempted to prevent her from responding to her vocation and she could not enter the Congregation of the Little Sisters of the Poor due to their interference. In 1872 her father relented and gave her his blessing for joining the religious life; her father died on 11 January 1875. Florido at once began catering to the needs of the old and the abandoned and soon town officials requested that she open a house for the old which she did this on 19 March 1875; the home was named "The Porch of Bethlehem". But she later became a member of the Mercedarians in the 1870s (accepted their habit on 1 November 1878) though soon decided to leave and establish her own congregation and approval was granted on 25 December 1880 for her to do so; her first profession saw her assume the name "Petra of Saint Joseph" in 1891. The local bishop granted his approval of the order at the beginning of 1883 and Pope Leo XIII granted his formal approval of the order in 1891. On 23 March 1891 she had set off for Rome to ask the pope to grant papal approval to her order and on arrival met with Cardinal Isidoro Verga. Her group then met with the pope and attended Mass where she received the Eucharist from him. Her perpetual profession was on 15 October 1891. Florido travelled to Rome in 1905. In 1883 she opened both a kindergarten and hospital in Ronda and later opened two houses; one in Andujar in 1885 and one in Martos in 1887.

Florido died on 16 August 1906 in Barcelona and her funeral was held on 18 August. Her remains were transferred elsewhere on 5 November 1920 but disappeared during the Spanish Civil War. The remains were found in 1983 and reburied on 10 June 1984.

Beatification

The Beatification process commenced in the Barcelona archdiocese in an informative process that opened in 1932 concluded its work in 1933 which was the accumulation of all documentation and witness testimonies. This all occurred despite the fact that the cause did not open on a formal level on 3 December 1944 under Pope Pius XII which conferred upon him the posthumous title Servant of God; her spiritual writings received theological approval on 26 February 1943. The second process in Barcelona continued the work of the first process in 1948 and it concluded in 1949. The formal decree of ratification of both processes came from the Congregation for Rites on 4 May 1952 and it ensured that the cause proceeded to the next stage.

The Congregation for the Causes of Saints and their consultants approved the cause on 16 December 1969 while the C.C.S. alone approved it sometime later on 15 December 1970. Florido was proclaimed to be Venerable on 14 June 1971 after Pope Paul VI recognized that she had lived a life of heroic virtue.

The miracle for beatification was investigated and had received C.C.S. validation on 18 October 1991. The medical experts approved this case on 4 February 1993 as did the theologians on 7 May 1993 and the C.C.S. on 15 June 1993. Pope John Paul II approved the miracle on 6 July 1993 and beatified Florido in Saint Peter's Square on 16 October 1994.

References

External links
 Hagiography Circle
 Ana Petra Pérez Florido

1845 births
1906 deaths
19th-century venerated Christians
19th-century Spanish nuns
20th-century venerated Christians
20th-century Spanish nuns
Beatifications by Pope John Paul II
Founders of Catholic religious communities
People from Málaga
Spanish beatified people
Venerated Catholics by Pope Paul VI